The New South Wales Department of Education is a department of the Government of New South Wales. In addition to other responsibilities, it operates primary and secondary schools throughout the state.

Q

R

S

T

U

V

W

X

Y

Z

See also
 List of government schools in New South Wales: A–F
 List of government schools in New South Wales: G–P

G Q-Z